The year 1850 in science and technology involved some significant events, listed below.

Biology
 May 25 – The young Hippopotamous Obaysch arrives at London Zoo from Egypt, the first seen in Europe since Roman times.
 Rewilding of Ascension Island begins.

Chemistry
 October 17 – James Young patents a method of distilling kerosene from coal.
 Rev. Levi Hill invents a color photography process, "helicromy", capable of basic rendering of reds and blues.

Mathematics
 July 2 – William Thomson communicates Stoke's theorem to George Stokes. Stokes presents a paper on the numerical calculation of a class of definite integrals and infinite series.
 Thomas Kirkman proposes Kirkman's schoolgirl problem.
 Victor Puiseux distinguishes between poles and branch points and introduces the concept of essential singular points.
 J. J. Sylvester originates the term matrix in mathematics.

Medicine
 March – Dr Benjamin Guy Babington founds the London Epidemiological Society.
 Central Criminal Lunatic Asylum for Ireland opened in Dundrum, Dublin, the first secure hospital in Europe.

Meteorology
 April 3 – British Meteorological Society founded.

Physics
 May – John Tyndall and Hermann Knoblauch publish a report on "The magneto-optic properties of crystals, and the relation of magnetism and diamagnetism to molecular arrangement".
 Rudolf Clausius publishes his paper on the mechanical theory of heat, which first states the basic ideas of the second law of thermodynamics.
 Hippolyte Fizeau and E. Gounelle measure the speed of electricity.
 Léon Foucault demonstrates the greater speed of light in air than in water, and establishes that the speed of light in different media is inverse to the refractive indices of the media, using a rotating mirror.
 George Stokes publishes a paper on the effects of the internal friction of fluids on the motion of pendulums.

Technology
 April 15 – Angers Bridge, a French suspension bridge, collapses in a storm with around 480 soldiers marching across it; about 226 are killed.
 July 14 – John Gorrie makes the first public demonstration of his ice-making machine, in Apalachicola, Florida.
 Completion of the Bibliothèque Sainte-Geneviève in Paris to the design of Henri Labrouste, the first major public building with an exposed cast-iron frame.

Institutions
 Astronomer Maria Mitchell becomes the first woman member of the American Association for the Advancement of Science.
 The University of Oxford in England establishes an Honour School (i.e. an undergraduate course) in Natural Science.

Awards
 Copley Medal: Peter Andreas Hansen
 Wollaston Medal: William Hopkins

Births
 January 5 – Sidney Browne (died - 1941), British military nurse.
 January 15 (January 3 O.S.) – Sofia Kovalevskaya (died 1891), Russian-born mathematician.
 January 24 – Hermann Ebbinghaus (died 1909), German psychologist.
 January 29 – Edmond Nocard (died 1903), French veterinarian and microbiologist.
 February 15 – Sophie Bryant (died 1922), Irish-born mathematician and educationalist.
 March 31 – Charles Walcott (died 1927), American paleontologist.
 April 10 - Mary Emilie Holmes (died 1906), American geologist and educator.
 May 18 – Oliver Heaviside (died 1925), English physicist.
 May 21 – Giuseppe Mercalli (died 1914), Italian volcanologist.
 May 23 – George Claridge Druce (died 1932), English botanist.
 June 6 – Karl Ferdinand Braun (died 1918), German-born physicist.
 August 30  – Charles Richet (died 1935), French physiologist, Nobel Prize winner.

Deaths
 March 27 – Wilhelm Beer (born 1797), German astronomer.
 April 9 – William Prout (born 1785), English chemist.
 May 10 – Joseph Louis Gay-Lussac (born 1778), French chemist and physicist.
 July 12 – Robert Stevenson (born 1772), Scottish lighthouse engineer.
 August 5 – Mary Anne Whitby (born 1783), English scientist.
 December 4 – William Sturgeon (born 1783), English inventor.

References

 
19th century in science
1850s in science